Women's Week Provincetown (formerly Women's Weekend) is an annual LGBT festival founded in 1984 that primarily serves lesbians. Held in mid-October in Provincetown, Massachusetts on Cape Cod, it is attended by almost 2,000 women and is "the longest running lesbian cultural event in the Northeast."

Organized by Women Innkeepers of Provincetown, the week hosts over 300 events, including film screenings, author readings, dune tours, concerts, dance parties, stand-up comedy, ceremonies, and community clambake.

See also

 Club Skirts Dinah Shore Weekend
 Michigan Womyn's Music Festival
 SuperShe Island
 Circuit party

References

External links
  Women's Week Provincetown 
  Provincetown Women's Week at PTown Events
  Provincetown for Women
  Clambake  2015 film by Andrea Meyerson (history of Women's Week in Provincetown)

Lesbian culture in the United States
Lesbian events
Women's events
Women's festivals
LGBT events in Massachusetts
Women in Massachusetts